This is a list of gliders/sailplanes of the world, (this reference lists all gliders with references, where available) 
Note: Any aircraft can glide for a short time, but gliders are designed to glide for longer.

G

Gabelier
(Raymond Gabelier)
 Gabelier RG-40

Gad'Arts
 Gad'Arts AM-58

Galatasaray
(Galatasaray High School)
 Galatasaray Kleopatra

Gallaudet
(Edson Fessenden Gallaudet)
 Gallaudet Hydrokite

Gannet
 Gannet G-4 Olympos

Garalevičiaus-Kulvinskio
(J. Garalevičiaus & A. Kulvinskio)
 Garalevičiaus-Kulvinskio GK-1

Gardner
(L. Gardner)
 Gardner Cumulus

Garstecki
(Tadeusz Garstecki)
 Garstecki Rywal (Rival) No.17 – Second Polish Glider Contest 17 May – 15 June 1925

GATC
(General Airborne Transport Company)
 GATC XCG-16
 GATC MC-1A

GBMZ
(GBMZ / August Hug)
 GBMZ Zögling

GCSA
(William Stancliffe Shackleton & Harold Bradley / GCSA -Gliding Club of South Australia)
 GCSA Lark

Gehrlein 
 Gehrlein GP-1
 Gehrlein Precursor

General Aircraft
(General Aircraft Ltd.)
 General Aircraft G.A.L.48 Hotspur
 General Aircraft G.A.L.48B Twin-Hotspur
 General Aircraft G.A.L.49 Hamilcar
 General Aircraft GAL.50 1/2 scale Hamilcar
 General Aircraft G.A.L.55
 General Aircraft G.A.L.56
 General Aircraft G.A.L.57
 General Aircraft G.A.L.58 Hamilcar X powered Hamilcar (2x Bristol Mercury)
 General Aircraft G.A.L.61

Gilbert
(J. Gilbert)
 Gilbert 1922 glider

Gilbert
(Octave Gilbert)
 Gilbert 1909 glider

Ginn-Lesniak
(Vic Ginn & Lesniak / London Gliding Club, Dunstable)
 Ginn-Lesniak Kestrel

Giuncu-Popa
(Octavian Giuncu & Ovidiu Popa / Atelierele de Reparaţii Material Volant - ARMV-2)
 Giuncu-Popa GP-2

Glaser-Dirks
See DG Flugzeugbau.

Glasfaser Velino
(Glasfaser Italiana SpA)
 Glasfaser Velino
 Glasfaser Nimeta - Nimbus 4 / Eta amalgam

Glasflügel
 Glasflügel BS-1 a.k.a. Björn Stender BS-1 or Stender BS-1
 Glasflügel H-30 GFK
 Glasflügel H-101 Salto
 Glasflügel H-201 Standard Libelle
 Glasflügel H-301 Libelle
 Glasflügel 202 Standard Libelle
 Glasflügel 203 Standard Libelle
 Glasflügel 204 Standard Libelle
 Glasflügel 205 Club Libelle
 Glasflügel 206 Hornet
 Glasflügel 303 Mosquito
 Glasflügel 304
 Glasflügel 401 Kestrel
 Glasflügel 402 Falconet
 Glasflügel 604

Glidersport
 Glidersport LightHawk

Gluhareff
Gluhareff M. S., Helsingfors
(H. Adaridy & M.S. Gluhareff, Helsingfors)
 Gluhareff 3M
 Gluhareff S-22

Gnewikow
(Karl Gnewikow)
 Gnewikow Gne-3

Godwin
(C.G. Godwin)
 Godwin Two-seater glider

Gomolzig
See Caproni Vizzola.

Göppingen 
(Martin Schempp / Wolf Hirth / Sportflugzeugbau Schempp-Hirth)
 Göppingen E-4
 Göppingen Gö 1 Wolf
 Göppingen Gö 2
 Göppingen Gö 3 Minimoa
 Göppingen Gö 4 Gövier
 Göppingen Gö 5
 Göppingen Gö 8

Gordon England 
(E.C. Gordon England / Georges England Ltd, Walton-on-Thames, Surrey)
 Gordon England 1922 glider

Görlitz 
(D.L.V. Gruppe Görlitz)
 Görlitz I

Gotha
(Gothaer Waggonfabrik)
 Gotha Go 242
 Gotha Go 244
 Gotha Go 345
 Kalkert (Gotha) Ka430

Göttingen
(Flieger Ortsgruppe Göttingen / Flavag - Fliegergruppe der Aerodynamischen Versuchsanstalt Göttingen / NSFK Ortsgruppe Göttingen )
 Göttingen IV Niedersachsen
 Flavag I Uhu
 Flavag II Kuckuck

GP Gliders
 GP 14 Velo

Graf von Saurma
 Graf von Saurma Milan

GRAL 
(Groupe rouennais d'aviation légère)
 Gral 3
 Gral 5
 Gral 6
 Gral 7

Grandin
(Henry Grandin)
 Grandin Chauve-souris
 Grandin Mouette

Granneman
(Hans Granneman)
 Granneman HG-1 Tölpel

Green-Tweed
(Frank Green & George Tweed)
 Green-Tweed GT-2

Greif 
(Greif Flugzeugbau Rendsburg)
 Greif I
 Greif II
 Greif III
 Greif IV
 Greif V-DSG

Gremyatsky
(Anatoli Grematsky)
 Gremyatsky Diskoplan

Gribovsky 
(Vladislav K. Gribovsky)
 Gribovsky G-1
 Gribovsky G-2
 Gribovsky G-3
 Gribovsky G-6
 Gribovsky G-7
 Gribovsky G-9 Dzsunka
 Gribovsky G-11
 Gribovsky G-12
 Gribovsky G-14
 Gribovsky G-16
 Gribovsky G-18
 Gribovsky G-29
 Gribovsky G-31
 Gribovsky Sans-Abri

Grob
(GROB-WERKE Burkhart Grob e.K.)
 Grob G102 Astir
 Grob G103 Twin Astir
 Grob G 103a Twin II
 Grob G 103c Twin III
 Grob G 104 Speed Astir
 Grob G 109

Grodziska
 Grodziska Mazowieckiego

Grokhovskii
(Pavel Ignatyevich Grokhovskii)
 Grokhovskii G-31
 Grokhovskii G-63
 Grokhovskii GN-4
 Grokhovskii GN-8

Gropp
(Herbert Gropp)
 Gropp Zaunkönig

Groshev 
(G.F. Groshev – USSR)
 Groshev G N° 2 TSK Komsomol
 Groshev G N° 6
 Groshev G N° 7
 Groshev GN-7
 Groshev GN-4
 Groshev GN-8

Gross 
(Dr. Frank R. Gross)
 Akron Condor
 Baker-McMillan Cadet
 Gross Sky Ghost
 Gross F-5

Grossklaus
(Helmut Grossklaus)
Grossklaus Silent Glider M
Grossklaus Silent Glider ME
Grossklaus Silent Racer

Group Genesis 
 Group Genesis Genesis 1 (prototype)
 Genesis 2 (production model)

Groux
(Georges Groux)
 Groux

Gruse 
(Maschinenfabrik August Gruse)
 Gruse Bo 15/1

Grzeszczyk 
(Szczepan Grzeszczyk)
 Grzeszczyk SG-3
 Grzeszczyk SG-7
 Grzeszczyk SG-21 Lwów
 Grzeszczyk SG-28

Grzmilas
(Tadeusz Grzmilas)
 Grzmilas Orkan I (Whirlwind I) No.10 – Second Polish Glider Contest 17 May – 15 June 1925

Guerchais-Roche 
(Établissement Roche / Ateliers Roche Aviation)
 Guerchais-Roche GR-70
 Guerchais-Roche SA-103 Emouchet
 Guerchais-Roche SA-104 Emouchet
 Guerchais-Roche GR-105
 Guerchais-Roche GR-107

Guignard
(Donat Guignard)
 Guignard 1934
 Guignard Chanute

Guilhabert
(Msr. Guilhabert from Gaillac, France)
 Guilhabert Pou-Planeur

Gumpert 
(Bruno Gumpert)
 Gumpert G.1
 Gumpert G.2
 Gumpert Schwalbe II – Gumpert, Bruno – Segelfliegergruppe des I/K.G.  Wiener Neustadt

Günar
 Günar 1

GVV Dal Molin 
(Grupo Volo a Vela Tommaso Dal Molin))
 GVV Dal Molin MD.1 Anfibio Varese
 GVV Dal Molin Anfibio Roma

Gyõr
(Gyõr Soaring Club, Gyõr - Aeroclub of the Rolling-stock Factory, Gyõr)
 Gyõr-2 (Ã. Lampich)
 Gyõr-3 Motor-Pilis (Ernõ Rubik)

Gysas
(A. Gysas)
 Gysas Nykstukas
 Gysas Zaibas

Notes

Further reading

External links

Lists of glider aircraft